Poloniny Dark-Sky Park is the first dark sky park in Slovakia. It became the 20th dark sky park in the world.

Natural total night darkness, which would be unaffected by artificial light, no longer exists in Slovakia because of light pollution, but there are still places where this influence is minimal. Such a place is the Poloniny National Park, which is in terms of light pollution the darkest area in Slovakia. Therefore, the Slovak Union of Astronomers started an initiative to establish a dark sky park there.

Location and area
Poloniny Dark-Sky Park is located in the northeast of the Slovak Republic on the border with Poland and Ukraine. The territory of the park itself is defined by area of the Poloniny National Park (298.05 km2) and a buffer zone (109.73 km2) and municipal territories of Kolonica, Ladomirov, Kalná Roztoka, Klenová, Ruská Volová (77.41 km2). The total area is 485.19 km2. Area of the park is characterized by having an exceptionally small population density (6 inhabitants per km2). It is also the least visited national park in Slovakia, so the human impact on the environment is minimal.

In terms of light pollution, Poloniny National Park is the darkest area in Slovakia. Natural night darkness and night biorhythms of all living organisms are disturbed the least there.

Poloniny National Park

Poloniny National Park is a national park in north eastern Slovakia at the Polish and Ukrainian borders, in the Bukovské vrchy mountain range, which belongs to the Eastern Carpathians. It was created on 1 October 1997 with a protected area of 298.05 km2 and a buffer zone of 109.73 km2. Selected areas of the park are included into Primeval Beech Forests of the Carpathians UNESCO World Heritage Site.

Establishment
Poloniny Dark-Sky Park was officially declared on December 3, 2010, in Snina. It was established on the occasion of the International Year of Biodiversity 2010 as the first dark sky area in Slovakia. Poloniny Dark-Sky Park was declared by agreement of six partner organizations.

Goals
Poloniny Dark-Sky Park was created to inform the public about the exceptionally preserved night environment in this area, to educate on the issue of protection of the environment against light pollution, to promote and protect the dark night sky, which is the basis of protecting the natural environment from light pollution.

The Milky Way is perfectly visible, without a telescope nearly 2,000 stars can be seen. Mountains preclude direct visibility of lights from the surrounding towns and villages. There is also a professional astronomical observatory located within the park.

See also
Poloniny National Park
Dark-sky preserve

External links
Poloniny Dark-Sky Park
International Dark-Sky Association

Dark-sky preserves
Astronomy in Slovakia
Darkness
Environmental protection
Protected areas established in 2010
Protected areas of Slovakia